Bulis bivittata is a species of "jewel beetles" in the subfamily Polycestinae, the only species in the genus Bulis.

References

Monotypic Buprestidae genera